John Douglas Rowland (7 April 1941 – 2020) was an English footballer who was known for his powerful 'hammer shot'. A forward, he scored 62 goals in 250 league games in a nine-year career in the Football League.

He began his career at Nottingham Forest in 1960, before being sold on to Port Vale for £6,000 in August 1962. In September 1966, he was sold on to Mansfield Town for £6,500. Two years later he joined Tranmere Rovers, before dropping into non-league football with South Shields in 1969; he finished his career at Derry City. His death was announced by Port Vale on 20 November 2020.

Career
Rowland played for Ironville Amateurs before joining First Division side Nottingham Forest in 1960. He played 26 league games under Andy Beattie in 1960–61 and 1961–62, scoring three goals. He also represented England youth level.

He was signed by Port Vale manager Norman Low for £6,000 in August 1962. Low was quickly replaced by Freddie Steele, and Rowland took a while to blend into the team, though he scored seven goals in 41 games in 1962–63. He scored just four goals in 28 games in the 1963–64 campaign and played in the FA Cup victory over Birmingham City and 0–0 draw with Liverpool at Anfield. He found his form by September 1964, and hit five goals in 43 games in 1964–65 under new manager Jackie Mudie, though this was not enough to prevent the "Valiants" slipping into the Fourth Division. He was then moved from right-wing to centre-forward and scored 23 goals in 46 games in the 1965–66 season to become the club's top scorer; he managed to equal Basil Hayward's club record of scoring in eight consecutive games from 1 September to 4 October. In September 1966, he was sold to Tommy Cummings' Mansfield Town for £6,500. He had made 166 appearances (149 in the league) and scored 43 goals (40 in the league) for the Vale. He was happy to stay at Vale Park, but Vale director Tommy Talbot advised him to take the move as the club were desperately short of funds.

The "Stags" finished ninth in the Third Division in 1966–67, though they only avoided relegation in 1967–68 under Tommy Eggleston after Peterborough United were hit with a 19-point deduction. In two seasons at Field Mill, Rowland made 53 appearances in all competitions, scoring 16 goals. He played for Tranmere Rovers in 1968–69, playing 26 league games and scoring three goals under Dave Russell's stewardship. He then dropped into non-league football with Northern Premier League side South Shields; he later turned out for Derry City.

Career statistics
Source:

References

1941 births
2020 deaths
People from Alfreton
Footballers from Derbyshire
English footballers
England youth international footballers
Association football forwards
Association football wingers
Nottingham Forest F.C. players
Port Vale F.C. players
Mansfield Town F.C. players
Tranmere Rovers F.C. players
South Shields F.C. (1936) players
Derry City F.C. players
English Football League players
Northern Premier League players